The year 1862 was the 81st year of the Rattanakosin Kingdom of Siam (now known as Thailand). It was the twelfth year in the reign of King Mongkut.

Incumbents
 King: Mongkut
 Front Palace: Pinklao
 Supreme Patriarch: Pavares Variyalongkorn

Events

January

February

March
15 March- British Governess Anna Leonowens arrived in Bangkok with her son Louis to teach English to 82 children. There she met His Majesty King Mongkut.

April

May

June

July

August

September

October

November

December

Births
 21 June - Prince Tisavarakumarn is born in Bangkok.

Deaths
 18 June - Jean-Baptiste Pallegoix died in Bangkok.

References

External links

 
1860s in Siam
Years of the 19th century in Siam
Siam
Siam